Lutheran denominations are Protestant church bodies that identify, to a greater or lesser extent, with the theology of Martin Luther and with the writings contained in the Book of Concord. Most Lutheran denominations are affiliated with one or more regional, national, or international associations, the largest of which—the Lutheran World Federation—has over 74 million members worldwide. There are also two smaller and more conservative international associations—the International Lutheran Council, with 7.15 million members, and the Confessional Evangelical Lutheran Conference, with approximately 500,000 members. Finally, the Global Confessional and Missional Lutheran Forum (Global Forum) is a global gathering of Confessional Lutheran bodies who wish to emphasize missional discipleship as the focal point of ministry in the world.

This list is grouped by affiliation with the four major international Lutheran associations mentioned above. This list does not include groups that have been merged into other groups (e.g. Hauge Synod), nor groups that have become defunct (e.g. Eielsen Synod). Some of the denominations belong to more than one of the four associations.

Lutheran World Federation
The Lutheran World Federation (LWF) is the largest association of national and regional Lutheran church bodies in the world. Founded in 1947 by 47 church bodies from 26 countries, the LWF has grown to include 145 church bodies in 98 countries.

International Lutheran Council
Founded in 1993, the International Lutheran Council (ILC) is the second largest international association of Lutheran churches after the LWF, representing 7.15 million Lutherans in 54 church bodies as of 2018. Unlike the members of the LWF, not all members of the ILC are in altar and pulpit fellowship with one another.

Confessional Evangelical Lutheran Conference
The Confessional Evangelical Lutheran Conference (CELC) is the third major international association of Lutheran church bodies, representing approximately 500,000 Lutherans in 32 church bodies.

Global Confessional and Missional Lutheran Forum
The Global Confessional and Missional Lutheran Forum (Global Forum) is the fourth major international association of Lutheran church bodies and organizations, representing Lutherans in church bodies across 15 nations.

Unaffiliated Lutheran denominations
The following denominations are not members of the LWF, ILC, CELC or Global Forum, though several of them work with or are in fellowship with individual members of those associations. In addition, a number of these denominations have fellowship agreements with one another, without being part of any larger association. Note that several of these denominations have congregations in multiple countries. In such cases, the denomination is listed under the country in which its headquarters is located.

See also
List of Lutheran dioceses and archdioceses
List of Lutheran denominations in North America

Notes

References

Denominations
Lutheran